Dilan Woutersz (born 20 October 1977) was a Sri Lankan cricketer. He was a right-handed batsman and right-arm medium-fast bowler who played for Nondescripts Cricket Club. He was born in Colombo.

Woutersz made a single first-class appearance for the team, during the 1999–2000 season, against Singha. He did not bat for the team, but bowled 12 overs, taking match figures of 0–42.

External links
Dilan Woutersz at Cricket Archive 

1977 births
Living people
Sri Lankan cricketers
Nondescripts Cricket Club cricketers